Johanna Talihärm (born 27 June 1993 in Tallinn) is an Estonian biathlete. She competed at the Biathlon World Championships 2013, and at the 2014 Winter Olympics in Sochi. She represented Estonia at the 2018 Winter Olympics.

Her brother Johan is also a biathlete.

Biathlon results
All results are sourced from the International Biathlon Union.

Olympic Games

World Championships

World Cup

Other competition

European Championships

Junior/Youth World Championships

References

External links

1993 births
Living people
Biathletes at the 2014 Winter Olympics
Biathletes at the 2018 Winter Olympics
Biathletes at the 2022 Winter Olympics
Estonian female biathletes
Olympic biathletes of Estonia
Sportspeople from Tallinn
Estonian expatriate sportspeople in the United States